Bruno Cabrerizo (born July 19, 1979) is a former Brazilian football player, model and actor.

Career
Cabrerizo joined Japanese J2 League club Sagan Tosu in 2003. He debuted as defensive midfielder in J2 against Shonan Bellmare on April 9. He played many matches as defensive midfielder and center back after the debut. He left Sagan in July.

Club statistics

Filmography

References

External links

J. League
 

1979 births
Living people
Male actors from Rio de Janeiro (city)
Brazilian people of Italian descent
Brazilian male television actors
Brazilian male telenovela actors
Brazilian male models
J2 League players
Sagan Tosu players
Association football defenders
Brazilian expatriate footballers
Expatriate footballers in Japan
Footballers from Rio de Janeiro (city)
Brazilian footballers